Indian car brands
 Tata Motors
Jaguar
Land Rover
 Mahindra & Mahindra
Sangyong
 Force Motors

Multiutility brands
Eicher Motors
Ashok Leyland
Swaraj Mazda

References

Automotive companies of India